The Canton of Boos is a former canton situated in the Seine-Maritime département and in the Haute-Normandie region of northern France. It was disbanded following the French canton reorganisation which came into effect in March 2015. It had a total of 38,802 inhabitants (2012).

Geography 
An area of farming and light industry in the arrondissement of Rouen, centred on the town of Boos. The altitude varies from 2m (Les Authieux-sur-le-Port-Saint-Ouen) to 162m (Le Mesnil-Esnard) with an average altitude of 142m.

The canton comprised 15 communes:

Amfreville-la-Mi-Voie
Les Authieux-sur-le-Port-Saint-Ouen
Belbeuf
Bonsecours
Boos
Fresne-le-Plan
Gouy
Le Mesnil-Esnard
Mesnil-Raoul
Montmain
La Neuville-Chant-d'Oisel
Franqueville-Saint-Pierre
Quévreville-la-Poterie
Saint-Aubin-Celloville
Ymare

Population

See also 
 Arrondissements of the Seine-Maritime department
 Cantons of the Seine-Maritime department
 Communes of the Seine-Maritime department

References

Boos
2015 disestablishments in France
States and territories disestablished in 2015